Black Darna is one of Darna's archenemies in the Darna (2005 TV Series). Katrina Halili played the role. Her costume was similar to Darna's trademark red and gold but in all black and gold. Halili played another Darna villain, Serpina (Valentina's half-sister), in Darna (2009 TV series).

Character description 

Black Darna is the result of Darna's cooped up emotions. Before she became Black Darna, she was Carol, Narda's boss at work who is also jealous of her. After merging unintentionally with the darker side of the original Darna's essence, Carol later became engulfed in a bizarre cocoon in the middle of the city causing a massive traffic jam. The real Darna encountered the cocoon beforehand and tried to destroy it, but it proved too indestructible even for her strength, forcing her to just let it be as it was not harming anyone in any way at that time, and instead proceeded to thwart a nearby occurring hostile takeover. Black Darna was conceived from the said cocoon shortly afterwards. Having all of the original Darna's strengths and abilities, Black Darna was undeniably one of the most formidable adversaries the heroine had to faced; she was also noticeably faster than Darna. Her only weakness is that like Darna herself, draws her powers from the white stone, which was how Darna stopped her by reverting to Narda.

See also
 Darna
 Darna (2005 TV Series)

References

External links

Mars Ravelo Superheroes web site
Darna at the International Catalogue of Superheroes
Darna 2005 TV series

Darna